Florence 'Flo' Kennedy is a former Rhodesian and Zimbabwean international lawn bowler.

Bowls career

World Championship
Kennedy started bowling in 1964 and won two medals at the 1981 World Outdoor Bowls Championship in Toronto; a silver medal in the singles and a bronze medal in the team event (Taylor Trophy).

Commonwealth Games
Kennedy won an historic gold medal for Zimbabwe at the Commonwealth Games because it was the first time that Zimbabwe as a nation competed in the Games.

She skipped the team and won the gold medal in the triples event with Anna Bates and Margaret Mills. This led to her being voted Zimbabwe Sportsperson of the Year in 1982.

In 1973 she won a bronze medal (with Thelma Ault and Lucie Oliver) at the South African Games and is a four times national singles champion. In 1975 she lost in the South African Masters final at Pretoria to Lucie Oliver and lost the Oliver again the following year in the Rhodesian Masters final.

References

Zimbabwean female bowls players
Living people
Bowls players at the 1982 Commonwealth Games
Commonwealth Games medallists in lawn bowls
Commonwealth Games gold medallists for Zimbabwe
Year of birth missing (living people)
Medallists at the 1982 Commonwealth Games